is a former electronic music producer from Japan. He primarily  made various types of ambient music like Ambient techno & Lowercase. He has lived in Japan, San Francisco, and New York, and has collaborated with musicians such as Pete Namlook, Bill Laswell, Andrew Deutsch,  Carl Stone, Terre Thaemlitz, Jonah Sharp, Taylor Deupree, and Uwe Schmidt.
After the release of his last album Inland in 2007, Inoue completely disappeared from the public eye.

Discography

Albums and collaborations
 Shades Of Orion (with Pete Namlook) (1993, reissued 2000)
 2350 Broadway (with Pete Namlook) (1993, reissued 1996)
 DATacide (with Uwe Schmidt as DATacide) (1993)
 Ambiant Otaku (1994, reissued 2000)
 Zenith (as Zenith) (1994)
 Electro Harmonix (with Jonah Sharp) (1994)
 Cymatic Scan (with Bill Laswell) (1995)
 Flowerhead (with Uwe Schmidt as DATacide) (1995)
 Mu (with Uwe Schmidt as Masters Of Psychedelic Ambiance) (1995)
 Organic Cloud (1995, reissued 2003)
 Slow And Low (1995)
 Second Nature (with Uwe Schmidt and Bill Laswell) (1995)
 Tokyo - Frankfurt - New York (with Haruomi Hosono and Uwe Schmidt as HAT) (1996)
 World Receiver (1996, reissued 2006)
 Waterloo Terminal (1998)
 Psycho-Acoustic (1998)
 Active/Freeze (with Taylor Deupree) (2000)
 Audio (with Charles Uzzell-Edwards and Daimon Beail) (2000)
 Fragment Dots (2000)
 Field Tracker (with Andrew Deutsch) (2001)
 Pict. Soul (with Carl Stone) (2001)
 Yolo (2005)
 Inland (May 2007)

See also
Ambient house
List of ambient music artists
List of people who disappeared
Yellow Magic Orchestra

References

External links 

Tetsu Inoue interview at AmbiEntrance

2000s missing person cases
Ambient musicians
American electronic musicians
Japanese electronic musicians
Japanese expatriates in the United States
Missing people
Missing person cases in Japan
Year of birth missing (living people)